The Chinese Elm cultivar Ulmus parvifolia 'Seiju' is a dwarf variety, a sport of 'Hokkaido'.

Description

'Seiju' is described as smaller than Catlin and faster growing than Hokkaido, distinguished from the latter by its larger leaves.

Pests and diseases
The species and its cultivars are highly resistant, but not immune, to Dutch elm disease, and unaffected by the Elm Leaf Beetle Xanthogaleruca luteola.

Cultivation
The tree is commercially available in the United States and Australia where it is popular as a bonsai subject. The tree was also listed in the UK until 2002.

Accessions

North America
Bartlett Tree Experts, US. Acc. no. 2004–519
Missouri Botanical Garden, St. Louis, Missouri, US. Acc. nos. 1999–1924, 1999–1925, 2003–2731.
Smith College, US. Acc. no. 29788

Europe

Grange Farm Arboretum , Sutton St. James, Spalding, Lincs., UK. Acc. no. 836.

Nurseries

North America

(Widely available)

Australasia

Yamina Rare Plants , Monbulk, Melbourne, Australia.

References

Chinese elm cultivar
Ulmus articles with images
Ulmus